Philip Whitcombe may refer to:

Philip John Whitcombe (born 1928), English cricketer for Worcestershire and Oxford University
Philip Arthur Whitcombe (1923–2015), English cricketer for Middlesex
Philip Sidney Whitcombe (1893–1989), English cricketer for Essex and in India